Charles William Harry Crichton (7 July 1872 – 8 November 1958) was a British sailor who competed in the 1908 Summer Olympics. He was a crew member of the British boat Dormy, which won the gold medal in the 6 metre class.

References

External links 
 
 
 

1872 births
1958 deaths
British male sailors (sport)
English Olympic medallists
Sailors at the 1908 Summer Olympics – 6 Metre
Olympic sailors of Great Britain
Olympic gold medallists for Great Britain
Olympic medalists in sailing
Medalists at the 1908 Summer Olympics